Foreign relations of Korea may refer to:

Foreign relations of North Korea
Foreign relations of South Korea
Joseon diplomacy, the foreign relations of the Joseon Dynasty